Aschersonia is a genus of fungi in the order Hypocreales and family Clavicipitaceae.

The genus name of Aschersonia is in honour of Paul Friedrich August Ascherson (1834 – 1913), a German botanist.

Species
Mycobank lists the following:

 Aschersonia abnormis
 Aschersonia acutispora
 Aschersonia aleyrodis Webber 1897 
 Aschersonia amazonica
 Aschersonia andropogonis
 Aschersonia aurantiaca
 Aschersonia australiensis Henn. 1903
 Aschersonia badia
 Aschersonia basicystis
 Aschersonia blumenaviensis
 Aschersonia brunnea
 Aschersonia caapi
 Aschersonia caespiticia
 Aschersonia calendulina
 Aschersonia calendulina
 Aschersonia carpinicola
 Aschersonia chaetospora
 Aschersonia cinnabarina
 Aschersonia coffeae
 Aschersonia columnifera
 Aschersonia confluens
 Aschersonia conica
 Aschersonia consociata
 Aschersonia crenulata
 Aschersonia crustacea
 Aschersonia crustata
 Aschersonia cubensis Berk. & M.A. Curtis 1868
 Aschersonia disciformis
 Aschersonia duplex
 Aschersonia eugeniae
 Aschersonia fimbriata
 Aschersonia flava
 Aschersonia flavescens
 Aschersonia flavocitrina
 Aschersonia formosensis
 Aschersonia fusispora
 Aschersonia goldiana
 Aschersonia guianensis
 Aschersonia henningsii
 Aschersonia hypocreoidea
 Aschersonia incrassata
 Aschersonia insperata
 Aschersonia intermedia
 Aschersonia jacarandae
 Aschersonia javanica
 Aschersonia javensis
 Aschersonia juruensis
 Aschersonia lauricola
 Aschersonia lecanii
 Aschersonia lecanioides
 Aschersonia luteola
 Aschersonia macrostromatica
 Aschersonia macularis
 Aschersonia marginata
 Aschersonia mellea
 Aschersonia microspora
 Aschersonia minutispora
 Aschersonia murrayae
 Aschersonia napoleonae
 Aschersonia narathiwatensis
 Aschersonia novoguineensis
 Aschersonia oxystoma
 Aschersonia oxystoma
 Aschersonia papillata
 Aschersonia paraensis
 Aschersonia paraphysata
 Aschersonia parasitica
 Aschersonia pediculoides
 Aschersonia philippinensis
 Aschersonia phthiurioides
 Aschersonia pisiformis
 Aschersonia pittieri
 Aschersonia placenta Berk. 1873
 Aschersonia rufa
 Aschersonia samoensis
 Aschersonia sclerotioides
 Aschersonia scutelliformis
 Aschersonia simplex
 Aschersonia spathulata
 Aschersonia spatulata
 Aschersonia suzukii
 Aschersonia tahitensis
 Aschersonia taitensis Mont. (1848) - type species
 Aschersonia tamurai
 Aschersonia tephrosicola
 Aschersonia tephrosiicola
 Aschersonia turbinata
 Aschersonia viridans
 Aschersonia viridula
 Aschersonia zenkeri

Note: other species may now be synonyms placed in similar genera such as Hypocrella.

References

External links

Hypocreales genera
Taxa named by Camille Montagne